This is a list of seasons played by Stabæk Fotball in Norwegian and European football from 1987 to the most recent completed season. It details the club's achievements in major competitions, and the top scorers for some season. The statistics is up to date as of the end of the 2019 season.

References

Seasons
 
Stabæk